Hanover Wayside is a historic wayside and national historic district located near Hanover Courthouse, Hanover County, Virginia. The district includes five contributing buildings, one contributing site, and one contributing structure.  It was built about 1937–1938 by the Civilian Conservation Corps (CCC) as a Recreation Demonstration Areas project. The buildings are in the rustic style and include the picnic shelter, wayside caretaker's house and public restroom, and garage.

It was listed on the National Register of Historic Places in 2002.

References

Parks on the National Register of Historic Places in Virginia
Historic districts on the National Register of Historic Places in Virginia
Buildings and structures completed in 1938
Buildings and structures in Hanover County, Virginia
National Register of Historic Places in Hanover County, Virginia